Bonita is an unincorporated community in Johnson County, Kansas, United States, and part of the Kansas City metropolitan area.

History
Bonita is a Spanish name meaning "beautiful".

Bonita had a post office from 1880 until 1934.

References

Further reading

External links
 Johnson County maps: Current, Historic, KDOT

Unincorporated communities in Johnson County, Kansas
Unincorporated communities in Kansas